The Saint also called Swami is a Bollywood film. It was released in 1941. It was directed by Abdul Rashid Kardar and starred Sitara Devi, P. Jairaj and Nazir in pivotal roles.

References

External links
 

1941 films
1940s Hindi-language films
Films directed by A. R. Kardar
Indian black-and-white films